Dimensions is a 2002 album by jazz band Octurn.  It was recorded at Studio Jet, Brussels from February 12 until February 15, 2002.  It is the fifth release compiled in the 11-CD box edited by De Werf the same year.

Track listing
Part 1 : "Dimensions" (Geoffroy De Masure) – 40:35
"Khora" – 1:27 
"Quadrature" – 5:29 
"Continuum" – 4:52 
"Alter Native" – 5:05 
"Perpetuum" – 1:09 
"Loga Rhythm" – 7:25 
"Chaos" – 7:25 
"Griot" – 3:55 
"Homo Sentimentalis" – 4:22 
"Griot (bis)" – 1:33 
Part 2 : "Haikus" (Bo Van der Werf) – 18:57 
"Aware" – 5:20 
"Sabi" – 6:41 
"Yugen" – 6:56 
Part 3 : "Les Premiers Des 42 Jours" (Antoine Prawerman) – 14:53 
"Les Premiers Des 42 Jours" – 3:30 
"Octurn Sans Haine Ne Nuit Point" – 4:27 
"Le Très Grand Frère d'Awa Toé" – 6:56

Personnel
 Bo Van der Werf - baritone saxophone, leader
 Laurent Blondiau - trumpet, flugelhorn
 Geoffroy De Masure - trombone
 Guillaume Orti - alto saxophone
 Fabian Fiorini - piano, keyboards
 Pierre Van Dormael - electric guitar
 Otti Van Der Werf - electric bass
 Jean-Luc Lehr - electric bass
 Chander Sardjoe - drums
 Norbert Lucarain - drums
 Stéphane Galland - drums
 Michel Seba - percussions

External links
 Jazz in Belgium website

Octurn albums
2002 albums